Corus caffer is a species of beetle in the family Cerambycidae. It was described by Fahraeus in 1872. It feeds on Acacia plants.

References

caffer
Beetles described in 1872